Carptima is a monotypic moth genus in the family Geometridae. Its only species, Carptima hydriomenata, is found in the US state of Arizona. Both the genus and species were first described by Pearsall in 1906.

References

External links

Larentiinae
Monotypic moth genera